Mullwharchar is a hill in the Dungeon Hills, a sub-range of the Galloway Hills range, part of the Southern Uplands of Scotland. Mullwarchar is situated to the north of Loch Enoch, west of Corserine, northeast of Merrick and east of Kirriereoch Hill. There are 3 cliffs on the mountain named The Slock, The Tauchers and The Organ Pipes and some routes on these are occasionally climbed. Mullwharchar's summit is fairly flat and dotted with erratics.

Nuclear Waste
A planning application was made in January 1978 to Kyle and Carrick District Council by the UKAEA to test drill on Mullwharchar for the purpose of dumping nuclear waste. On 24 October 1978, the Council rejected the application after considerable local protest, which included a petition with 100,000 signatures being sent to the Queen. The appeal against the decision cost £19,700.

References

Mountains and hills of the Southern Uplands
Marilyns of Scotland
Grahams
Donald mountains
Climbing areas of Scotland
Mountains and hills of Dumfries and Galloway